Fredrik Hermansson (born 18 July 1976) is a Swedish musician. He was a keyboardist and backing vocalist in the Swedish progressive rock band Pain of Salvation from 1996 to 2011. He also works as a freelance piano player and composer. Fredrik studied both classical and jazz piano at Birka Folkhögskola in Östersund, Sweden, and chamber music in Västerås, Sweden, where he received a master's degree. On 8 November 2011, a message to fans by Daniel Gildenlöw noted that Fredrik Hermansson would also be leaving the band at the conclusion of the current tour.

Discography

Pain of Salvation
Entropia (1997)
One Hour by the Concrete Lake (1998)
Ashes (2000) (single)The Perfect Element, part I (2000)Remedy Lane (2002)12:5 (2004) (live)BE (2004)BE (Original Stage Production) (2005) (live)Scarsick (2007)Linoleum (2009)Road Salt One (2010)Road Salt Two (2011)

SoloPiano'' (2007 and 2009)

References

External links
 Personal Fredrik Hermansson web-site

1976 births
Living people
Swedish keyboardists
Pain of Salvation members